A problem is a difficulty which may be resolved by problem solving.

Problem(s) or The Problem may also refer to:

People
 Problem (rapper), (born 1985) American rapper

Books
 Problems (Aristotle), an Aristotelian (or pseudo-Aristotelian) collection of problems in question and answer form
 The Problem (play), by A. R. Gurney

Film and TV
 Problems (TV series), a 2012 Australian comedy television series.
 The Problem with Jon Stewart, an American current affairs television series.

Music

Albums
 The Problem (album), by Mathematics
 Problems (album), a 2019 album by The Get Up Kids

Songs
 "Problem" (Ariana Grande song), 2014
 "Problems" (Matt Corby song), 2022
 "Problem" (Natalia Kills song), 2013
 "Problems" (The Everly Brothers song), 1958
 "Fuckin' Problems", sometimes known as "Problems", a 2012 song by A$AP Rocky
 "Problem", by Becky G
 "Problem", by Erin Bowman
 "Problem", by Šarlo Akrobata from Bistriji ili tuplji čovek biva kad...
 "Problems", by Against Me! from Searching for a Former Clarity
 "Problems", by AZ from 9 Lives
 "Problems", by Ben Kweller from Freak Out, It's Ben Kweller
 "Problems", by Bran Van 3000 from Glee
 "Problems", by Lil Peep from Come Over When You're Sober, Pt. 1
 "Problems", by Sex Pistols from Never Mind the Bollocks, Here's the Sex Pistols
 "Problemz", by Beast Coast from Escape from New York

Other uses 
 Problem (horse), a Thoroughbred racehorse
 "Problem", the term used in bouldering for the path that a climber takes to complete his or her route

See also 
 
 
 Chess problem
 Computational problem
 Mathematical problem
 Problem child (disambiguation)